The 1986 Southland Conference men's basketball tournament was held March 4–6, 1986 with quarterfinal matchups being held at the home arena of the higher seed and the semifinals and championship game played at Fant-Ewing Coliseum in Monroe, Louisiana.

Northeast Louisiana defeated  in the championship game, 59–57, to win their first Southland men's basketball tournament.

The Indians received a bid to the 1986 NCAA Tournament as No. 13 seed in the West region. They were the only Southland member invited to the tournament.

Format
All seven of the conference's members participated in the tournament field. They were seeded based on regular season conference records, with the top seed earning a bye into the semifinal round. The other six teams began play in the quarterfinal round.

First round games were played at the home court of the higher-seeded team. All remaining games were played at the Fant-Ewing Coliseum in Monroe, Louisiana.

Bracket

References

Southland Conference men's basketball tournament
Tournament
Southland Conference men's basketball tournament
Southland Conference men's basketball tournament
Basketball competitions in Louisiana
Sports in Monroe, Louisiana
College sports tournaments in Louisiana